Larocheopsis macrostoma is a species of sea snail, a marine gastropod mollusc or micromollusc in the family Larocheidae.

References

External links
 To World Register of Marine Species

Larocheidae
Gastropods described in 2012